Navamalai is a small village in the panchayat town of Kottur-Malayandipattinam in Coimbatore District in the Indian state of Tamil Nadu. It has one of the hydroelectric power houses of Tamil Nadu Electricity Board known as Aliyar Power House, because it is one of the main hydro-electric power production bases built along the river Aliyar.

Geography
As the name suggests, it is surrounded by nine mountains [Navamalai means in Tamil "Nine Mountains"] of Western Ghats. The River Aliyar falls from the high mountains and starts its journey through the plains from this small beautiful village. The southern end of Aliyar Dam touches the village. There are many other streams in the mountains all of which pass through the village before joining the river Aliyar. The mountains are very green and the forests have rare trees and plants. Granite patches are visible at many places in the mountains. Thick forests give cover to many wild animals. It is now part of Indira Gandhi Wild Park.

Demographics

Navamalai has three types of population, namely 1. the people who work for the Tamil Nadu Electricity Board, 2. the tribal folks and 3. agricultural labourers and petty shop owners. The settlement of electricity board, referred as EB Camp is on the east side of the village and it has well-built houses with all infrastructure. The tribals live on the roadsides, along the banks of river aliyar and on a hillock in the middle of an agricultural land belonging to a Telugu chettiar, on the western side. Agricultural labours live in the fields and small shop keepers live near the EB camp.  
The land belongs to Tamil Nadu Electricity Board, Department of Forests, Government of Tamil Nadu. All the agricultural land [more than 100 acres] belongs to one person, who belonged to the Telugu Chettiar caste, a migrant community from Andhra Pradesh which forms the single largest minority [but wealthy] community in the state of Tamil Nadu. The tribals who were permanent residents of the place were made to agricultural labourers and security personnel. Today they do not work on the fields, they go out to different places to work as daily wages, they live in huts and mud houses.

History
Its history is not written anywhere. The land records show just about 150 years of history.

Villages in Coimbatore district